The Lost Take is the third solo studio album by American multi-instrumentalist Dosh. It was released on Anticon on October 17, 2006.

Critical reception
Marisa Brown of AllMusic gave the album 3.5 stars out of 5, saying: "In terms of what Dosh has always done, The Lost Take isn't drastically different: it's experimental instrumental music that hesitates to adhere itself too firmly to any categorization, but it's a consistent and interesting release nonetheless, and probably the best of his career."

Track listing

References

External links
 

2006 albums
Dosh albums
Anticon albums